Jérôme Hergault (born 5 April 1986) is a French professional footballer who plays as a defender.

He has previously played for Lavaur, Luzenac, Rouen and Red Star.

Career
Hergault joined FC Lorient in summer 2019. He left Lorient on 26 August 2022, one of four players to do so that day, alongside Houboulang Mendes, Fabien Lemoine and Jérémy Morel.

References

1986 births
Living people
People from Montmorency, Val-d'Oise
Footballers from Val-d'Oise
French footballers
Association football defenders
Ligue 1 players
Ligue 2 players
Championnat National players
FC Rouen players
Red Star F.C. players
Luzenac AP players
AC Ajaccio players
FC Lorient players